Caulastrocecis is a genus of moth in the family Gelechiidae.

Species
Caulastrocecis furfurella (Staudinger, 1871)
Caulastrocecis gypsella (Constant, 1893)
Caulastrocecis interstratella (Christoph, 1873)
Caulastrocecis perexigella Junnilainen, 2010
Caulastrocecis pudicellus (Mann, 1861)
Caulastrocecis tripunctella (Snellen, 1884)

Former species
Caulastrocecis salinatrix (Meyrick, 1926)

References

 
Anomologini